Model Wife is a web series created, written and produced by Corey Cavin, Josh Lay, and Bill Grandberg. The series is broadcast on the Internet and premiered on March 27, 2012. So far, 10 episodes have been made and the show can be found distributed across the web including on YouTube and Blip. The series was nominated for a Writers Guild of America award in January 2013 for Outstanding Achievement in Writing Original New Media.

The main characters of Model Wife are a normal guy, his supermodel wife, and their two neighbors. The plot revolves around blogger Corey, who manages to marry a supermodel. Each episode sees Corey get into situations and having to deal with dilemmas arising from having a supermodel for a girlfriend.

Cavin is a comedian, writer, and actor living in New York City, often performing at the UCB Theatre in New York and working for Nikki & Sara LIVE on MTV. Lay is also a comedian, writer, and actor living in New York City, with work including as a cast member and teaching artist for the nationally recognized children's entertainment ensemble Story Pirates.

Season 1 

Episode 1:  Nickname - Everyone but Corey has multiple names. 
Episode 2: Sleeping Wife - Cory leaves Karme home alone with Bill and Josh. Bad idea 
Episode 3: Bedroom - Karme tries to keep herself occupied while Cory finishes some blogging work before bed. 
Episode 4: Assistants - Karme hires some assistants and Cory can't take it. Josh and Bill try to build a shelf. 
Episode 5: Photo Shoot - Karme goes on a photo shoot. 
Episode 6: 10 Per Cent - Bill and Josh use Karme to sell stuff on eBay so they can go to Fantasy Football Fantasy Camp. 
Episode 7: Hash-tags - Josh gets a job at a trendy Twitter bar, Karme and Bill fight Karme's nemesis, and Cory gets drunk. 
Episode 8: The Contract - Karme signs an exclusive modeling job and Cory tries to keep up with her fast talking agent. 
Episode 9: Handbag - Cory, Josh, & Bill crash Carme's exclusive event, which leaves Bill and Josh to rescue Carme and Cory locked out in the cold. 
Episode 10:  Dufflebag - Josh and Bill try to get through to Carme inside the club, while Cory goes literally insane to get his wife back.

References

External links 
Model Wife on Blip

American comedy web series
2012 web series debuts